Sant'Anna di Stazzema, officially Sant'Anna, is a village in Tuscany, Italy. Administratively, it is a frazione of the comune of Stazzema, in the province of Lucca.

History

In 1944, it was the site of a notorious Nazi crime against humanity committed by a part of German 16th SS Panzergrenadier Division Reichsführer-SS during World War II. In the morning of 12 August, about 560  villagers and refugees (including 130 children) were murdered and their bodies burnt in a scorched earth policy action. After the war, the village was only partially rebuilt.

The massacre gained notoriety from 1994. During an investigation of the military attorney Antonino Intelisano, 695 files about war crimes in Italy during World War II were found in a wooden cabinet, known as the Armadio della vergogna (armoire of shame), located in a palace of Rome.

Since 2000, it has been the site of the Italian National Park of Peace (Parco Nazionale della Pace) with memorials and a museum dedicated to the massacre.

Geography
Located in the Apuan Alps, Sant'Anna is a mountain village that is 12 km far from Pietrasanta and 16 from its Marina, on the Mediterranean Sea; 18 km from Viareggio, 24 from Massa and 37 from Carrara. The nearest train station is that of Pietrasanta on the Pisa-Genoa line and the nearest motorway exit is "Viareggio-Camaiore" on the A12.

Gallery

Popular culture
The massacre inspired the novel Miracle at St. Anna by James McBride, and Spike Lee's film (2008) of the same title that was based on it.

See also
Retignano
Volegno

References

External links

 Sant'Anna official website
 Website about Sant'Anna massacre

Frazioni of the Province of Lucca
Ghost towns in Italy

History museums in Italy
Museums established in 2000
Peace museums
World War II museums in Italy